Carolina Werner (born 2 March 1994) is a German sailor. She represented Germany, along with partner Paul Kohlhoff, in the Nacra 17 class at the 2016 Summer Olympics in Rio de Janeiro. They finished in 13th place.

References 

1994 births
Living people
German female sailors (sport)
Olympic sailors of Germany
Sailors at the 2016 Summer Olympics – Nacra 17
Nacra 17 class sailors